The Junior Club World Cup (JCWC) is an international junior ice hockey tournament sanctioned by IIHF. The first edition of the tournament took place between 30 August 2011 and 3 September 2011 in Omsk. It featured 8 teams from 8 countries.

History
The first Junior Club World Cup took place in Omsk, Russia, in 2011.  The first tournament was won by the Minor Hockey League's Krasnaya Armiya. They defeated Energie Karlovy Vary 7–2 in the final game.

In the second tournament, in 2012, Hockey Canada and USA Hockey both sent a higher calibre of representatives to the event. In the final, the Ontario Hockey League's Sudbury Wolves defeated the United States Hockey League's Waterloo Black Hawks 2–0 in a closely fought championship game.

The 2013 tournament was played again in Omsk, Russia and won by the hometown Omskie Yastreby, defeating Finland's HPK 2-0 in the final.  The USHL's Dubuque Fighting Saints won bronze with a 4-1 effort over Dinamo-Shinnik.

Results by year

References

External links
World Cup on the website of the MHL
World Cup on Eurohockey.com
JCWC on the twitter

 
Junior ice hockey competitions
International Ice Hockey Federation tournaments